The following radio stations broadcast on 100.0 MHz.

Belgium
Nostalgie Wallonie in Brussels

China 
 CNR The Voice of China in Suzhou
 CNR Business Radio in Chongqing
 CRI Easy FM in Lhasa

Turkey
Power FM in İstanbul, Ankara, İzmir, Bursa, Denizli and Antalya
Radyo 3 in Hatay

United Kingdom
Kiss in London
Heart Scotland in Alexandria
 from the (Devon frequency)

References

Lists of radio stations by frequency